Himachal Pradesh National Law University Shimla (HPNLU Shimla) is an Indian public law school and a National Law University located at Shimla, Himachal Pradesh, India. It is the 20th National Law University established in India. NLU Shimla is governed by High Court of Himachal Pradesh

See also 

 National Law University, Delhi
 Indian National Law Universities

References

National Law Universities
Law schools in Himachal Pradesh
Universities in Himachal Pradesh
Education in Shimla
Educational institutions established in 2016
2016 establishments in Himachal Pradesh